Wood Glacier is a tributary glacier flowing southeast and entering Trafalgar Glacier just east of Mount McDonald in the Victory Mountains, Victoria Land. It shares a common saddle with Lensen Glacier which flows northward. Named by the southern party of NZFMCAE, 1962–63, for B.L. Wood, geologist member of New Zealand Geological Survey Antarctic Expedition (NZGSAE), 1957–58, which also worked in this general area.

Glaciers of Victoria Land
Borchgrevink Coast